Blue-tongued skinks comprise the Australasian genus Tiliqua, which contains some of the largest members of the skink family (Scincidae). They are commonly called blue-tongued lizards or simply blue-tongues or blueys in Australia. As suggested by these common names, a prominent characteristic of the genus is a large blue tongue that can be bared as bluff-warning to potential enemies. The type of predator/threat that is near will determine the intensity of colour present in the tongue. In addition, their blue tongue will produce a response in the prey which will in turn diminish the attack. The tongue can also deform itself and produce a thick mucus in order to catch prey. They are relatively shy in comparison with other lizards, and also significantly slower due to their shorter legs.

Systematics and distribution
Blue-tongued skinks are closely related to the genera Cyclodomorphus and Hemisphaeriodon. All species are found on mainland Australia with the exception of Tiliqua gigas, which occurs in New Guinea and various islands of Indonesia. the Tanimbar blue-tongued skink, a subspecies of Tiliqua scincoides, is also found on several small Indonesian islands between Australia and New Guinea. Tiliqua nigrolutea, the Blotched blue-tongued skink, is the only species present in Tasmania.

Ecology
Most species are diurnal, ground-foraging omnivores, feeding on a wide variety of insects, gastropods, flowers, fruits and berries. The pygmy blue-tongue is again the exception, being primarily an ambush predator of terrestrial arthropods. All are viviparous, with litter sizes ranging from 1-4 in the pygmy blue-tongue and shingleback to 5-24 in the eastern and northern blue-tongues.

Species

In captivity
Blue-tongues skink species are generally docile, gentle, quiet and easily tamed, and can make a good reptile pet for beginners. Although they are not aggressive, they have strong jaws and teeth, meaning that a bite from a skink can be painful.  It is advisable not to startle or provoke them, as they may bite if they feel threatened. Specimens can live up to 20 years or more.

Notes

References
  (2006). Using ancient and recent DNA to explore relationships of extinct and endangered Leiolopisma skinks (Reptilia: Scincidae) in the Mascarene islands. Molecular Phylogenetics and Evolution 39(2): 503–511.  (HTML abstract)
  (1988). Mate fidelity in an Australian lizard Trachydosaurus rugosus (Scincidae). Copeia 1987(3): 749-757.
  (1990). Comparison of displaced and retained partners in a monogamous lizard Tiliqua rugosa. Australian Wildlife Research 17: 135-140.
  (1996). A prey record of the Eastern Blue-tongue Tiliqua scincoides for the common brown snake Pseudonaja textilis. Monitor 8(3): 155.

External links

 Bluetongue fact file
 Blue-tongued Lizards in New South Wales

Skinks of Australia
Reptiles of Indonesia
Skinks of New Guinea
Tiliqua
Skink, Blue-tongued
Articles containing video clips
Taxa named by John Edward Gray
Reptiles as pets